The Râușor is a right tributary of the Râul Mare in Romania. It discharges into the Râul Mare in Ostrovel.

Tributaries
The following rivers are tributaries to the river Râușor:

Left: Vălereasca, Valea Cernei
Right: Ștevia, Izvorul cu Apă, Strugariu, Negrele, Frăsina

References

Rivers of Romania
Rivers of Hunedoara County